This is the discography of British pop rock band Dexys Midnight Runners, currently known officially as Dexys.

Albums

Studio albums

Live albums

Compilation albums

Video albums

Singles

References

Discographies of British artists
Pop music group discographies
Rock music group discographies
New wave discographies